Poul Zellmann (born 2 September 1995) is a German swimmer. He competed in the men's 200 metre freestyle event at the 2017 World Aquatics Championships. In 2019, he competed in two events at the 2019 World Aquatics Championships held in Gwangju, South Korea.

References

External links
 

1995 births
Living people
Sportspeople from Potsdam
German male swimmers
German male freestyle swimmers
Swimmers at the 2020 Summer Olympics
Olympic swimmers of Germany
20th-century German people
21st-century German people